Victor John "V. J." Peter  (19 June 1937 – 30 June 1998) was an Indian professional field hockey player. A three-time Olympian who played as a halfback, he was a part of the Indian national team that won the silver, gold and bronze medals respectively in the 1960, the 1964 and the 1968 Olympic Games. Peter's brother Victor Philips was a member of the 1975 World Cup winning team.

Born in Madras (now Chennai), Peter represented his employer Madras Engineer Group, and Services at the club level. He was renowned for his "dribbling skills, ball control and playmaking" and was called by former teammates Harbinder Singh and Inam-ur Rahman as "one of the best inside-rights India ever produced". Another former teammate Gurbux Singh credited him as having been the "architect of India's triumph over Pakistan in the 1964 Tokyo Olympics final." Peter was also instrumental in India's gold medal winning campaign at the 1966 Asian Games. Following his death in June 1998, another former teammate Charles Cornelius recalled, "Peter was pure magic, and I will never forget the combination of Mohinder Lal, Joginder and Peter." M. P. Ganesh felt he was a "very artistic player and his passing was accurate and well-timed."

References

External links 
 
 

1937 births
1998 deaths
Field hockey players from Chennai
Indian male field hockey players
Olympic field hockey players of India
Olympic gold medalists for India
Olympic silver medalists for India
Olympic bronze medalists for India
Olympic medalists in field hockey
Medalists at the 1960 Summer Olympics
Medalists at the 1964 Summer Olympics
Medalists at the 1968 Summer Olympics
Field hockey players at the 1960 Summer Olympics
Field hockey players at the 1964 Summer Olympics
Field hockey players at the 1968 Summer Olympics
Asian Games medalists in field hockey
Field hockey players at the 1966 Asian Games
Asian Games gold medalists for India
Medalists at the 1966 Asian Games
Recipients of the Arjuna Award